HMS Wolf was a 14-gun brig of the Royal Navy that was launched in 1814 from Woolwich Dockyard, too late for the war. The Navy sold her 1825 and she then became a merchant and whale fishing vessel. She was wrecked in the South Seas in 1837.

Naval career
Wolf sailed to Sheerness on 22 September 1814.

Commander Bernard Yeoman commissioned her on 5 December 1819 for the Cork station. He then sailed her on 27 February 1819. She served on the Irish Station in 1819.

When His Majesty King George visited Dublin in 1821, Wolf was part of the naval escort. Yeoman frequently dined with His Majesty on HMY Royal George, and while the king was in Dublin, Yeoman lived with the household, attended the king in public, and was generally considered as forming part of the royal suite.

Commercial service
Wolf paid off in 1825. The Admiralty listed her for sale at Plymouth on 27 January 1825, and she sold that same day to Thomas S. Benson for £3,1000.

Wolf first appeared in Lloyd's Register (LR) in the volume for 1826.

She underwent several changes of ownership. She was working as a whaler in the Pacific Ocean when she hit an uncharted rock (now called Wolf Rock) on 6 August 1837 off Lord Howe Island, and sank.

Citations and references
Citations

References

 

1814 ships
Ships built in Woolwich
Brigs of the Royal Navy